Actustar is a French celebrity gossip online magazine. The magazine is part of Hi Media which acquired it in 2006. It is headquartered in Montigny Le Bretonneux, France.

Controversy
Actustar on 13 March 2001 published an alleged interview with Kyle Bradford, in which he claimed that he and actor Tom Cruise had a homosexual affair. The story also appeared in the Mexican tabloid TVyNovelas. The affair supposedly occurred during Cruise's marriage to Nicole Kidman and Kidman's discovery of this secret relationship was related to their separation. Cruise categorically denied the story and sued Bradford (Chad Slater) for $10 million.

References

External links 

Celebrity magazines
French-language magazines
French news websites
Magazines established in 2000